The Lieutenant Governor and Speaker of the Senate of Tennessee is the presiding officer of the Tennessee Senate and first in line in the succession to the office of governor of Tennessee in the event of the death, resignation, or removal from office through impeachment and conviction of the governor of Tennessee.

Under the Tennessee State Constitution of 1870, the speaker of the Senate is elected by the Tennessee State Senate from among its members.  The full title of the office is lieutenant governor and speaker of the Senate; the title of lieutenant governor is granted to the Speaker by statutory law enacted in 1951 in recognition of the fact that the Speaker is the governor's designated successor; such has been the case since the adoption of the first state constitution and Tennessee statehood in 1796.  The job is in theory a part-time one, paying $48,500 per year; the Lieutenant Governor is a member of the Tennessee General Assembly (the base pay for which is $16,500 per year), which is a legislature limited to 15 organizational days and 90 legislative days with full pay and expenses in each two-year sitting. The Lieutenant Governor as a member of the Tennessee Senate has a four-year term as a Senator but is subject to reelection by his peers with each new legislature; as the Senators' terms are staggered by class and there could be a 50 percent turnover in membership between one legislature and the next.

The current lieutenant governor is Randy McNally, who was elected to the post on January 10, 2017, and is the second (consecutive) Republican to hold the post since Reconstruction.  He succeeded Ron Ramsey, who held the post continuously from 2007 to 2017.

Since Tennessee became a state in 1796, four speakers of the Senate have succeeded to the governorship:

William Hall, who succeeded upon the resignation of Sam Houston;
Dewitt Clinton Senter, who succeeded William G. Brownlow, who resigned to accept election to the U.S. Senate;
John I. Cox, who succeeded James B. Frazier, who resigned as governor after arranging his appointment to the unexpired term of U.S. Senator William B. Bate, who had died in office; and
Henry Hollis Horton, who succeeded Austin Peay, the only Governor of Tennessee to die in office .

Under the Tennessee Constitution, in the event of succession the Speaker does not become "acting governor" or "interim governor," but assumes the title and full powers of the governorship, much as the vice president of the United States becomes president upon the death, resignation or removal from office of the president. An important distinction is that if the speaker becomes governor during the first 18 months of the governor's four-year term, a special election for the balance of the term will be held at the next U.S. general election.  If the speaker becomes governor after the first 18 months of the term, the Speaker will serve the entire remainder of the term. In either case, any partial term counts toward the limit of two consecutive terms. For example, if the current speaker, Randy McNally, had ascended to the governorship during the second term of Bill Haslam, he would have been eligible to run for a full term in 2018, but would have had to leave office in 2023. However, this provision has not been put into practice since the gubernatorial term was extended to four years in 1953.

List 
The following is a list of people who have served as Lieutenant Governor of Tennessee (formal title: Lieutenant Governor and Speaker of the Senate) since the current Tennessee State Constitution was adopted in 1870.  The title of Lieutenant Governor was formally added in 1951; however, the Speaker of the Senate has been the designated successor to the Governor of Tennessee since Tennessee achieved statehood in 1796.  Lieutenant Governor Ron Ramsey (who served 2007–2017) was the first Republican to hold this office since the adoption of the current constitution, all previous ones having been Democrats.

 Parties

Pre-1870

References

External links 

 
Lists of state lieutenant governors of the United States